Cell test/s/ing may mean:

Biology
 Cell culture assays
 Biopsy test, testing cells from a biopsy
 Sickle cell test, the test for sickle cell anemia
 Antigen leukocyte cellular antibody test

Telecomm
 CDMA mobile test set, mobile phone tester
 Mobile Device Testing, cell phone testing

Entertainment
 Cell Test (Prison Break) an episode of the TV series Prison Break